Weimar Classicism was a German literary and cultural movement, whose practitioners established a new humanism from the synthesis of ideas from Romanticism, Classicism, and the Age of Enlightenment. It was named after the city of Weimar, Germany, because the leading authors of Weimar Classicism lived there.

The Weimarer Klassik movement lasted thirty-three years, from 1772 until 1805, and involved intellectuals such as Johann Wolfgang von Goethe, Johann Gottfried Herder, Friedrich Schiller, and Christoph Martin Wieland; and then was concentrated upon Goethe and Schiller during the period 1788–1805.

Development

Background 
The German Enlightenment, called "neo-classical", burgeoned in the synthesis of Empiricism and Rationalism as developed by Christian Thomasius (1655–1728) and Christian Wolff (1679–1754). This philosophy, circulated widely in many magazines and journals, profoundly directed the subsequent expansion of German-speaking and European culture.

The inability of this common-sense outlook convincingly to bridge "feeling" and "thought", "body" and "mind", led to Immanuel Kant's epochal "critical" philosophy. Another, though not as abstract, approach to this problem was a governing concern with the problems of aesthetics. In his Aesthetica of 1750 (vol. II; 1758)  Alexander Baumgarten (1714–62) defined "aesthetics", which he coined earlier in 1735, with its current intention as the "science" of the "lower faculties" (i.e., feeling, sensation, imagination, memory, et al.), which earlier figures of the Enlightenment had neglected. (The term, however, gave way to misunderstandings due to Baumgarten's use of the Latin in accordance with the German renditions, and consequently this has often led many to falsely undervalue his accomplishment.) It was no inquiry into taste—into positive or negative appeals—nor sensations as such but rather a way of knowledge. Baumgarten's emphasis on the need for such "sensuous" knowledge was a major abetment to the "pre-Romanticism" known as Sturm und Drang (1765), of which Goethe and Schiller were notable participants for a time.

Cultural and historical context 
Following Goethe's competition with and separation from Wieland and Herder, the movement Weimar Classicism is often described to have occurred only between Goethe's first stay in Rome (1786) and the death of Schiller (1805), his close friend and collaborator, underrating especially Wieland's influence on German intellectual and poetic life. Therefore, the Weimar Classicism could also be started with the arrival of Wieland (1772) and extended beyond Schiller's death until the death of Wieland (1813) or even of Goethe himself (1832).

In Italy, Goethe aimed to rediscover himself as a writer and to become an artist, through formal training in Rome, Europe's 'school of art'. While he failed as an artist, Italy appeared to have made him a better writer.

Schiller's evolution as a writer was following a similar path to Goethe's. He had begun as a writer of wild, violent, emotion-driven plays. In the late 1780s he turned to a more classical style. In 1794, Schiller and Goethe became friends and allies in a project to establish new standards for literature and the arts in Germany.

By contrast, the contemporaneous and efflorescing literary movement of German Romanticism was in opposition to Weimar and German Classicism, especially to Schiller. It is in this way both may be best understood, even to the degree in which Goethe continuously and stringently criticized it through much of his essays, such as "On Dilettantism", on art and literature. After Schiller's death, the continuity of these objections partly elucidates the nature of Goethe's ideas in art and how they intermingled with his scientific thinking as well, inasmuch as it gives coherence to Goethe's work. Weimar Classicism may be seen as an attempt to reconcile—in "binary synthesis"—the vivid feeling emphasized by the Sturm und Drang movement with the clear thought emphasized by the Enlightenment, thus implying Weimar Classicism is intrinsically un-Platonic. On this Goethe remarked:

The Weimar movement was notable for its inclusion of female writers.  Die Horen published works by several women, including a serially published novel, Agnes von Lilien, by Schiller's sister-in-law Caroline von Wolzogen.  Other women published by Schiller included Sophie Mereau, Friederike Brun, Amalie von Imhoff, Elisa von der Recke, and Louise Brachmann.

Between 1786 and Schiller's death in 1805, he and Goethe worked to recruit a network of writers, philosophers, scholars, artists and even representatives of the natural sciences such as Alexander von Humboldt to their cause.  This alliance later became known as 'Weimar Classicism', and it came to form a part of the foundation of 19th-century Germany's understanding of itself as a culture and the political unification of Germany.

Aesthetic and philosophical principles 
These are essentials used by Goethe and Schiller:

 Gehalt: the inexpressible "felt-thought", or "import", which is alive in the artist and the percipient that he or she finds means to express within the aesthetic form, hence Gehalt is implicit with form. A work's Gehalt is not reducible to its Inhalt.
 Gestalt: the aesthetic form, in which the import of the work is stratified, that emerges from the regulation of forms (these being rhetorical, grammatical, intellectual, and so on) abstracted from the world or created by the artist, with sense relationships prevailing within the employed medium.
 Stoff: Schiller and Goethe reserve this (almost solely) for the forms taken from the world or that are created. In a work of art, Stoff (designated as "Inhalt", or "content", when observed in this context) is to be "indifferent" ("gleichgültig"), that is, it should not arouse undue interest, deflecting attention from the aesthetic form. Indeed, Stoff (i.e., also the medium through which the artist creates) needs to be in such a complete state of unicity with the Gestalt of the art-symbol that it cannot be abstracted except at the cost of destroying the aesthetic relations established by the artist.

Primary authors

Goethe and Schiller 

Although the vociferously unrestricted, even "organic", works that were produced, such as Wilhelm Meister, Faust, and West-östlicher Divan, where playful and turbulent ironies abound, may perceivably lend Weimar Classicism the double, ironic title "Weimar Romanticism", it must nevertheless be understood that Goethe consistently demanded this distance via irony to be imbued within a work for precipitate aesthetic affect.

Schiller was very prolific during this period, writing his plays Wallenstein (1799), Mary Stuart (1800), The Maid of Orleans (1801), The Bride of Messina (1803) and William Tell (1804).

Primary works of the period

Christoph Martin Wieland 
 Alceste, (stage play, 1773, first on stage: Weimar, May 25, 1773)
 Die Geschichte der Abderiten, (novel on ancient Abdera, Leipzig 1774–1780)
 Hann und Gulpenheh, (rhymed novel, Weimar 1778)
 Schach Lolo, (rhymed novel, Weimar 1778)
 Oberon, (rhymed novel, Weimar 1780)
 Dschinnistan, (tom. I-III, Winterthur 1786–1789)
 Geheime Geschichte des Philosophen Peregrinus Proteus, (novel, Weimar 1788/89; Leipzig 1791)
 Agathodämon, (novel, Leipzig 1796–1797)
 Aristipp und einige seiner Zeitgenossen, (novel on Aristippus, tom. I-IV, Leipzig: Göschen 1800–1802)

Johann Gottfried Herder 
 Volkslieder nebst untermischten anderen Stücken (1778–1779, ²1807: Stimmen der Völker in Liedern)
 Ideen zur Philosophie der Geschichte der Menschheit (essays, tom. I-IV, 1784–1791)
 Briefe zur Beförderung der Humanität, (collected essays, 1791–1797)
 Terpsichore, (Lübeck 1795)
 Christliche Schriften, (5 collections, Riga 1796–1799)
 Metakritik zur Kritik der reinen Vernunft, (essay, Part I+II, Leipzig 1799)
 Kalligone, (Leipzig 1800)

Johann Wolfgang (von) Goethe 
 Egmont ("Trauerspiel", begun in 1775, published 1788)
 Wilhelm Meisters theatralische Sendung (novel from 1776, published 1911)
 Stella. Ein Schauspiel für Liebende (stage play, 1776)
 Iphigenie auf Tauris ("Iphigenia in Tauris", stage play, published 1787)
 Torquato Tasso (stage play, 1780–, published 1790)
 Römische Elegien (written 1788–90)
 Venezianische Epigramme (1790)
 Faust. Ein Fragment (1790)
 Theory of Colours 1791/92)
 Der Bürgergeneral (stage play, 1793)
 Reineke Fuchs ("Reineke Fox", hexametric epic poem, 1794)
 Unterhaltungen deutscher Ausgewanderten ("Conversations of German Refugees", 1795)
 Das Märchen, ("The Green Snake and the Beautiful Lily", fairy tale, 1795)
 Wilhelm Meisters Lehrjahre ("Wilhelm Meister's Apprenticeship", novel, 1795/96)
 Faust. Eine Tragödie ("Faust" I, 1797–, first print 1808)
 Novelle (1797– )
 Hermann und Dorothea ("Hermann and Dorothea", hexametric epic poem, 1798)
 Die natürliche Tochter (stage play, 1804)
 Die Wahlverwandtschaften ("Elective Affinities", novel, 1809)

Friedrich (von) Schiller 
 Don Karlos, (stage play, 1787)
 Über den Grund des Vergnügens an tragischen Gegenständen, (essay, 1792)
 Augustenburger Briefe, (essays, 1793)
 Über Anmut und Würde, (essay, 1793)
 Kallias-Briefe, (essays, 1793)
 Über die ästhetische Erziehung des Menschen, ("On the Aesthetic Education of Man", essays, 1795)
 Über naive und sentimentalische Dichtung, (essay, 1795)
 Der Taucher, (poem, 1797)
 Die Kraniche des Ibykus, (poem, 1797)
 Ritter Toggenburg, (poem, 1797)
 Der Ring des Polykrates, (poem, 7987)
 Der Geisterseher, ("The Ghost-seer", (1789)
 Die Bürgschaft, (poem, 1798)
 Wallenstein (trilogy of stage plays, 1799)
 Das Lied von der Glocke (poem, 1799)
 Maria Stuart ("Mary Stuart", stage play, 1800)
 Die Jungfrau von Orleans ("The Maid of Orleans", stage play, 1801)
 Die Braut von Messina ("The Bride of Messina", stage play, 1803)
 Das Siegesfest (poem, 1803)
 Wilhelm Tell "(William Tell", stage play, 1803/04)
 Die Huldigung der Künste (poem, 1804)
 Demetrius (stage play, incomplete, 1805)

By Goethe and Schiller in collaboration 

 Die Horen (edited by Schiller, periodical, 1795–96)
 Musenalmanach (editorship, many contributions, 1796–97)
 Xenien (poems, 1796)
 Almanach (editorship, many contributions, 1798–1800)
 Propyläen (periodical, 1798–1801)

See also: works by Herder, works by Goethe, and works by Schiller.

Selected literature

Primary 

 Schiller, J. C. Friedrich, On the Aesthetic Education of Man: In a Series of Letters, ed. and trans. by Wilkinson, Elizabeth M. and L. A. Willoughby, Clarendon Press, 1967.

Secondary 

 Amrine, F, Zucker, F. J., and Wheeler, H. (Eds.), Goethe and the Sciences: A Reappraisal, BSPS, D. Reidel, 1987, 
 Bishop, Paul & R. H. Stephenson, Friedrich Nietzsche and Weimar Classicism, Camden House, 2004, .
 —, "Goethe's Late Verse", in The Literature of German Romanticism, ed. by Dennis F. Mahoney, Vol. 8 of The Camden House History of German Literature, Rochester, N. Y., 2004.
 Borchmeyer, Dieter, Weimarer Klassik: Portrait einer Epoche, Weinheim, 1994, .
 Buschmeier, Matthias; Kauffmann, Kai: Einführung in die Literatur des Sturm und Drang und der Weimarer Klassik, Darmstadt, 2010.
 Cassirer, Ernst, Goethe und die geschichtliche Welt, Berlin, 1932.
 Daum, Andreas W., "Social Relations, Shared Practices, and Emotions: Alexander von Humboldt’s Excursion into Literary Classicism and the Challenges to Science around 1800", in Journal of Modern History 91 (March 2019), 1–37.
 Ellis, John, Schiller's Kalliasbriefe and the Study of his Aesthetic Theory, The Hague, 1970.
 Kerry, S., Schiller's Writings on Aesthetics, Manchester, 1961.
 Nisbet, H. B., Goethe and the Scientific Tradition, Leeds, 1972, .
 Martin, Nicholas, Nietzsche and Schiller: Untimely Aesthetics, Clarendon Press, 1996, .
 Reemtsma, Jan Philipp, "Der Liebe Maskentanz": Aufsätze zum Werk Christoph Martin Wielands, 1999, .
 Stephenson, R. H., "The Cultural Theory of Weimar Classicism in the light of Coleridge's Doctrine of Aesthetic Knowledge", in Goethe 2000, ed. by Paul Bishop and R. H. Stephenson, Leeds, 2000.
 —, "Die ästhetische Gegenwärtigkeit des Vergangenen: Goethes 'Maximen und Reflexionen' über Geschichte und Gesellschaft, Erkenntnis und Erziehung", Goethe-Jahrbuch, 114, 1997, 101–12; 382–84.
 —, 'Goethe's Prose Style: Making Sense of Sense', Publications of the English Goethe Society, 66, 1996, 31–41.
 —, Goethe's Conception of Knowledge and Science, Edinburgh, 1995, .
 Wilkinson, Elizabeth M. and L. A. Willoughby, "'The Whole Man' in Schiller's theory of Culture and Society", in Essays in German Language, Culture and Society, ed. Prawer et al., London, 1969, 177–210.
 —, Goethe, Poet and Thinker, London, 1972.
 Willoughby, L. A., The Classical Age of German Literature 1748–1805, New York, 1966.

See also 

 Ernst Cassirer
 S. T. Coleridge
 J. G. Fichte
 Jena Romanticism
 Johann Georg Hamann
 Johann Gottfried Herder
 Friedrich Hölderlin
 A. v. Humboldt
 W. v. Humboldt
 C. G. Jung
 C. G. Körner
 Johann Heinrich Meyer
 Karl Philipp Moritz
 Friedrich Nietzsche
 Jean-Jacques Rousseau
 F. W. J. Schelling
 Weltliteratur
 Christoph Martin Wieland

Notes

External links

Primary sources 
 "On the Sublime" by Schiller
 "Introduction to the Propyläen" by Goethe

Other sources 
 Weimar Classicism in Literary Encyclopedia
 Klassik Stiftung Weimar 
 Goethes Allianz mit Schiller 
 Der späte Goethe 
 Centre for Intercultural Studies—Ernst Cassirer and Weimar Classicism
 English Goethe Society
 Goethe Society of North America

Johann Wolfgang von Goethe
German literary movements
Neoclassical movements
Age of Enlightenment
Classicism
Classicism
Friedrich Schiller
German literature by period
18th-century German literature
19th-century German literature